is a Japanese gravure idol and model who typically aimed for the cute, innocent schoolgirl look prior to her 2011 marriage. She is represented by Platinum Production.

History
Ogura was born in Mobara, Chiba, and regularly, if not entirely seriously, claims to be one  of the apple-shaped planet Korin. This is apparently an in-joke dating back to her middle school days. Having an alternate name was trendy at one point, and one of her friends told her that she looked like a Momoka. She liked the name and still uses it today.

She is known outside Japan for her song  which is the ending theme of the anime School Rumble. Ogura's fame as a model has also spread beyond Japan and she was named as one of the "7 most irresistibly cute Japanese idols" by the Thailand version of FHM magazine in 2010.

Personal life
She married Isao Kikuchi on October 10, 2011, in Hawaii. In March 2017, Ogura announced that she and Kikuchi were divorcing. In December 2018 she had married for the second time. On July 27, 2022, Ogura announced that she divorced for the second time.

References

External links
Yuko Ogura official website 

1983 births
People from Mobara
Japanese gravure models
Japanese idols
Japanese television personalities
Living people
Models from Chiba Prefecture
Musicians from Chiba Prefecture
21st-century Japanese singers